Damaske is a surname. Notable people with the surname include:

Magdalena Damaske (born 1996), Polish volleyball player
Tanja Damaske (born 1971), German javelin thrower